The Coburg Lark is a breed of fancy pigeon. Coburg Larks, along with other varieties of domesticated pigeons, are all descendants of rock pigeons (Columba livia).

See also 
List of pigeon breeds

References

External links 
Coburg Lark Pigeon - Pigeonpedia
Pigeon breeds